Phil Keen (born 20 October 1983 in Reading, Berkshire) is a British motor car racing driver. He is an engineer from Henley on Thames.

Racing

Complete British GT Championship results
(key) (Races in bold indicate pole position in class) (Races in italics indicate fastest lap in class)

† Driver did not finish, but was classified as he completed 90% race distance.

Complete GT World Challenge Europe Sprint Cup results
(key) (Races in bold indicate pole position) (Races in italics indicate fastest lap)

Partial GT Cup Championship results
(key) (Races in bold indicate pole position in class – 1 point awarded just in first race; races in italics indicate fastest lap in class – 1 point awarded all races;-

† Keen was ineligible for points as he was an invitation entry.

Stunt work 
Keen is known for his work on Ben Collins Stunt Driver (2015) and Monday Motorsport (2017).

References

External links 
 Phil Keen's listing on the Driver Database

1983 births
Living people
People from Reading, Berkshire
English racing drivers
British GT Championship drivers
American Le Mans Series drivers
European Le Mans Series drivers
24 Hours of Le Mans drivers
Britcar 24-hour drivers
24H Series drivers
WeatherTech SportsCar Championship drivers
Action Express Racing drivers
Euronova Racing drivers
International GT Open drivers
Lamborghini Squadra Corse drivers
Le Mans Cup drivers